The following radio stations broadcast on FM frequency 87.7 MHz:

Argentina 
 Alta voz in La Plata, Buenos Aires
 Conexión in Córdoba
 Libertad in Rosario, Santa Fe
 La Mira in Santa Fe de la Vera Cruz, Santa Fe
 Océano in La Matanza, Buenos Aires
 Publica Lujan in Lujan, Buenos Aires
 Radio Graffiti in Mar del Plata, Buenos Aires
 LRBO in Buenos Aires 
 La Voz de la Esperanza in Rosario, Santa Fe
 Voces in La Rioja

Brazil
In Brazil, the frequency 87.7 FM is one of the frequencies reserved for community radio stations. These stations have power limited to up to 25 watts and coverage limited to a radius of up to 1 km.

It also uses Pan American analog TV sound VHF channel 6 in PAL-M (83.25 - 87.75 MHz).

China 
 CNR China Traffic Radio in Chengdu

Germany
Radio Hashtag +

Greece
En Lefko

Japan
 Banana FM, Wakayama, Japan

Malaysia
 Radio Klasik in Kuala Lumpur

Netherlands

Radio 10, North-west and midregion

New Zealand
Various low-power stations up to 1 watt

North America
87.75 MHz, a frequency-modulated audio subcarrier used by all NTSC-M analog channel 6 television stations (discontinued July 13, 2021 in the United States)
For a list of channel 6 television stations transmitting using a modification of the ATSC 3.0 digital TV standard to carry an analog FM audio feed on 87.75 MHz, usually advertised as 87.7 FM, see Channel 6 radio stations in the United States.

Spain

Canary Islands
TKO Gold, Costa Blanca

Turkey
TRT FM in Gaziantep- Hacıbaba

United Kingdom 
87.7 MHz is commonly used for stations operating under the Restricted Service Licence, such as:
 Radio Wimbledon - Broadcast during The Championships, Wimbledon
 Donington Park Race Circuit broadcast commentary for all events throughout the season, knows as “Radio Donington”
New Wine FM - Broadcast during the New Wine National Gathering in Somerset for the duration of the conference
 Bailrigg FM, Lancaster University, Bailrigg, England
 Brighton Festival Radio, Brighton, England
 Eastbourne Youth Radio, Eastbourne, England
 NME Radio in Manchester, England
 Radio Ramadhan, Glasgow, Scotland
 Storm FM, University of Wales (Prifysgol Bangor University), Bangor, Gwynedd, Wales
 Worthy FM, A radio station broadcast during the Glastonbury Festival
 Wychwood FM A radio station broadcast during Wychwood Festival in Cheltenham
 Withybush FM, Withybush Hospital, Haverfordwest, Pembrokeshire, Wales
 Honiton Community College Radio FM, Honiton Community College, Honiton, Devon, South West England
 Infinity Radio (Stamford) Lincs
 Radio Christmas (Amersham) Buckinghamshire
 Knockhill Racing Circuit use this frequency to broadcast 'Knockhill FM' on race days
 Goodwood Festival of Speed broadcasts radio programming during the Festival of Speed and Goodwood Revival
 Brands Hatch uses this frequency during events to broadcast 'Radio Brands'
 FCOT FM, Farnborough, Hampshire broadcasts locally during their one-month live transmission from the local Farnborough College of Technology
 Oulton Park uses this frequency during race events to broadcast BSB Radio
 Silverstone Circuit uses this frequency to broadcast Silverstone FM radio station.
 Xpression FM broadcasts on this frequency from the University of Exeter
 Thruxton Race Circuit BTCC
  pure west radio Haverfordwest

References 

Lists of radio stations by frequency